Johnny Marr (born John Martin Maher, 31 October 1963) is an English musician, songwriter and singer. He first achieved fame as the guitarist and co-songwriter of the Smiths, who were active from 1982 to 1987. He has since performed with numerous other bands and embarked on a solo career.

Born in Manchester, to Irish parents, Marr formed his first band at the age of 13. He was part of several bands with Andy Rourke before forming the Smiths with Morrissey in 1982. The Smiths attained commercial success and were critically acclaimed, with Marr's jangle pop guitar style becoming a distinctive part of the band's sound, but separated in 1987 due to personal differences between Marr and Morrissey. Since then, Marr has been a member of the Pretenders, The The, Electronic, Modest Mouse, and the Cribs, and he has become a prolific session musician, working with names such as Pet Shop Boys, Talking Heads, Bryan Ferry and Hans Zimmer.

Having released an album titled Boomslang in 2003 under the name Johnny Marr and the Healers, Marr released his first solo album, The Messenger, in 2013. His second solo album, Playland, was released in 2014, followed by a third, Call the Comet, in 2018. Marr's autobiography, Set the Boy Free, was published in 2016.

In 2010, Marr was voted the fourth-best guitarist of the last 30 years in a poll conducted by the BBC. Phil Alexander, editor-in-chief of Mojo, described him as "arguably Britain's last great guitar stylist". In 2013, NME honoured Marr with its "Godlike Genius" award: "Not content with rewriting the history of music with one of the world's greatest ever bands, the Smiths, he's continued to push boundaries and evolve throughout his career, working with some of the best and most exciting artists on the planet."

Early life
Marr (né John Martin Maher) was born on 31 October 1963 in Saint's Mary's Hospital in Manchester, son of John Joseph Maher and Frances Patricia Doyle, Irish emigrants to England from County Kildare. The family lived in Ardwick Green and moved to Wythenshawe in 1972. Marr attended St Aloysius Primary School in Ardwick before moving to Sacred Heart Primary School. From 1975, he attended St Augustine's Catholic Grammar School, which in 1977 merged with other schools to form St John Plessington High School. Marr had aspirations to be a professional football player. He was approached by Nottingham Forest and had trials with Manchester City's youth team.

Marr's said his family's move to Wythenshawe was "like we'd moved to Beverly Hills", and that the move led to him meeting "a bunch of guitar players" which "changed his life". The Cult guitarist Billy Duffy was in a high school band that practised across the street from Marr's new house, and Marr would hang out listening to them rehearsing. He learned to play the guitar with LP vinyl records and a guitar chords dictionary without a teacher. Marr formed his first band, the Paris Valentinos, at the age of 13, with Andy Rourke (who had gone to the same high school as Duffy) and Kevin Williams (later an actor, known as Kevin Kennedy), performing for the first time at a Jubilee party in Benchill in June 1977, playing Rolling Stones and Thin Lizzy covers.

In 1979, he played a single gig at Wythenshawe Forum with a band called Sister Ray and re-united with Rourke in a band called White Dice. White Dice entered a demo-tape competition organised by  NME and won an audition for F-Beat Records, which they attended in April 1980 but were not signed. Around the age of 14, he began spelling his name "Marr" to simplify the pronunciation for those who had difficulty with his birth name "Maher", and to avoid confusion with Buzzcocks drummer John Maher.

In October 1980, Marr enrolled at Wythenshawe College, and was President of the school's Student Union. White Dice dissolved in 1981. Marr and Rourke then formed a funk band, Freak Party, with Simon Wolstencroft on drums. Around this time, Marr first met Matt Johnson, with whom he later collaborated.

The Smiths

By early 1982, Freak Party had fizzled out, being unable to find a singer. Marr approached Rob Allman, singer in White Dice, who suggested Steven Morrissey, a singer with the short-lived punk band the Nosebleeds. Marr approached a mutual friend asking to be introduced and they visited Morrissey at his house in Kings Road, Stretford, in May.

Marr's jangly Rickenbacker and Fender Telecaster guitar playing became synonymous with the Smiths' sound. Marr's friend Andy Rourke joined as bass player and Mike Joyce was recruited as drummer. Signing to indie label Rough Trade Records, they released their first single, "Hand in Glove", on 13 May 1983. By February 1984, the Smiths' fanbase was sufficiently large to launch the band's long-awaited debut album to number two in the UK chart. Early in 1985, the band released their second album, Meat Is Murder. It was more strident and political than its predecessor, and it was the band's only album (barring compilations) to reach number one in the UK charts. During 1985 the band completed lengthy tours of the UK and the US while recording the next studio record, The Queen Is Dead.

In 1989 Spin magazine rated The Queen is Dead as number one of "The Greatest Albums Ever Made". Spin was not alone in this designation—numerous periodicals rank the Smiths and their albums, especially The Queen is Dead, high on their best ever lists. NME, for example, has dubbed the Smiths the most important rock band of all time. A legal dispute with Rough Trade had delayed the album by almost seven months (it had been completed in November 1985), and Marr was beginning to feel the stress of the band's exhausting touring and recording schedule. He later told NME, "'Worse for wear' wasn't the half of it: I was extremely ill. By the time the tour actually finished it was all getting a little bit... dangerous. I was just drinking more than I could handle." Meanwhile, Rourke was fired from the band in early 1986 due to his use of heroin, although he was reinstated in short order. Despite their continued success, personal differences within the band—including the increasingly strained relationship between Morrissey and Marr—saw them on the verge of splitting.

In July 1987, Marr left the group, and auditions to find a replacement for him proved fruitless. By the time Strangeways, Here We Come (named after Strangeways Prison, Manchester) was released in September, the band had split up. The breakdown in the relationship has been primarily attributed to Morrissey's becoming annoyed by Marr's work with other artists and Marr's growing frustration with Morrissey's musical inflexibility. Referring to the songs recorded in the band's last session together (B-sides for the "Girlfriend in a Coma" single, which preceded the album's release), Marr said "I wrote 'I Keep Mine Hidden', but 'Work Is a Four-Letter Word' I hated. That was the last straw, really. I didn't form a group to perform Cilla Black songs." In 1989, in an interview with young fan Tim Samuels (later a BBC journalist), Morrissey claimed the lack of a managerial figure and business problems were to blame for the band's eventual split. In a 2016 interview, Marr agreed with this.

In 1996, Smiths' drummer Mike Joyce took Morrissey and Marr to court, claiming that he had not received his fair share of recording and performance royalties. Morrissey and Marr had claimed the lion's share of the Smiths' recording and performance royalties and allowed ten per cent each to Joyce and Rourke. Composition royalties were not an issue, as Rourke and Joyce had never been credited as composers for the band. Morrissey and Marr claimed that the other two members of the band had always agreed to that split of the royalties, but the court found in favour of Joyce and ordered that he be paid over £1 million in back pay and receive 25% thenceforth.

Marr and Morrissey have repeatedly stated they will not reunite the band. In 2005, VH1 attempted to get the band back together on its Bands Reunited show but abandoned its attempt after the show's host, Aamer Haleem, failed to corner Morrissey before a show. In December 2005 it was announced that Johnny Marr and the Healers would play at Manchester v Cancer, a benefit show for cancer research being organised by Andy Rourke and his production company, Great Northern Productions. Rumours suggested that a Smiths reunion would occur at this concert but were dispelled by Marr on his website.

In an October 2007 interview on BBC Radio Five Live, Marr hinted at a potential reformation in the future, saying that "stranger things have happened so, you know, who knows?" Marr went on to say that "It's no biggy. Maybe we will in 18 or 32 years' time when we all need to for whatever reasons, but right now Morrissey is doing his thing and I'm doing mine, so that's the answer really." This was the first indication of a possible Smiths reunion from Marr, who previously had said that reforming the band would be a bad idea. In 2008 Marr and Morrissey met and discussed the possibility of a reunion, but after initial enthusiasm from both parties, neither pursued the idea.

Marr's guitar playing "was a huge building block" for more Manchester bands that followed the Smiths. The Stone Roses guitarist John Squire has stated that Marr was a major influence. Oasis lead guitarist Noel Gallagher credited the Smiths as an influence, especially Marr, whom he described as a "fucking wizard", also stating that "he's unique, you can't play what he plays."

Post-Smiths

The Pretenders, The The, Electronic (1987–1999)
In August 1987, he was very briefly an official member of the Pretenders. In late 1987, he toured with the band and appeared on the single "Windows of the World" b/w "1969". He then left the Pretenders, and recorded and toured with The The from 1988 to 1994, recording two albums with the group. He simultaneously formed Electronic with New Order's Bernard Sumner. Electronic were intermittently active throughout the 1990s, releasing their final album in 1999.

Session work (1987–2002)
In 1992 Marr and Billy Duffy recorded a cover version of Ennio Morricone's The Good, the Bad and the Ugly for the NME compilation album Ruby Trax.

He has also worked as a session musician and writing collaborator for artists including Pet Shop Boys, Bryan Ferry, Billy Bragg, Kirsty MacColl, Black Grape, Jane Birkin, Talking Heads, and Beck. Marr played guitar on four songs on Talking Heads' final album Naked, including the single "(Nothing But) Flowers", and he prominently appears in that song's music video. 
Marr played guitar on several Pet Shop Boys songs; he continues to have guest appearances on their albums, with his most significant contribution on Release (2002). The only remix that Marr has ever done was for Pet Shop Boys—it was a mix of his favourite track from their 1987 album, Actually, called "I Want to Wake Up", and was released as the b-side to 1993's "Can You Forgive Her?" He later worked as a guest musician on the Oasis album Heathen Chemistry. He also joined Oasis on stage at a gig in 2001, playing "Champagne Supernova" and "I Am the Walrus".

Johnny Marr and the Healers (2000–present)
In 2000, Marr recruited drummer Zak Starkey (son of Ringo Starr), Cavewaves guitarist Lee Spencer and former Kula Shaker bassist Alonza Bevan for his new project, 'Johnny Marr and the Healers'. The band had taken two years to come together as Marr had wanted members to be chosen "by chemistry". Their debut album Boomslang was released in 2003, with all lyrics and lead vocals by Marr. A second album was originally scheduled for release in April 2005, and a short tour was expected soon after, but Marr has since stated that the band is on the "side burner" for the time being.

7 Worlds Collide (2001–2009)

Marr performed two Smiths songs and music by others with a supergroup called 7 Worlds Collide consisting of members from Pearl Jam, Radiohead, Split Enz and others, assembled by Neil Finn of Split Enz and Crowded House in 2001. A second set of concerts took place in December 2008/January 2009, and an album of new studio material titled The Sun Came Out was released in August 2009 to raise money for Oxfam.

Modest Mouse (2006–2009)
In addition to his work as a recording artist, Marr has worked as a record producer. In 2006, he began work with Modest Mouse's Isaac Brock on songs that eventually were featured on the band's 2007 release, We Were Dead Before the Ship Even Sank. The band subsequently announced that Marr was a fully fledged member, and the reformed line-up toured extensively throughout 2006–07.

The new album reached number one on the American Billboard charts in late March 2007. For Marr, this was the first time he had had a number one record in the US. The highest chart position before that was with Electronic, who made the Top 40 in the singles chart with "Getting Away With It".

While touring in Los Angeles with Modest Mouse, Marr spent a day in John Frusciante's home studio and contributed to Frusciante's album The Empyrean. He recorded several guitar tracks on songs "Enough of Me" and "Central".

The Cribs (2008–2011)

Marr joined the Cribs in 2008, after meeting Gary Jarman when they were both in Portland, Oregon. In 2009 they recorded the album Ignore the Ignorant, which was released on 7 September that year and peaked at No. 8 on the UK charts. Marr has said the album is "as good as anything I've done"..

In April 2011 it was confirmed that Marr would no longer be part of the band. Marr, who had been understood to officially leave the band in January, released a statement in which he affirmed that he would be working on solo material "over the next year or so."

Marr returned to play with the Cribs during the second of two special Christmas shows at Leeds Academy on 19 December 2013.

Further session work and solo albums (2011–present)
In the late 2007, Marr's daughter Sonny performed backing vocals on the track "Even a Child" on Crowded House's album Time on Earth, on which her father Marr played guitars. He played a large role in making the score for the 2010 science-fiction/drama film Inception, which was written and directed by Christopher Nolan. Using a 12-string-guitar, he produced repetitive, simple melancholic tones that became a character theme for the protagonist, played by Leonardo DiCaprio. "I kept coming up with this phrase 'churned-up,'" Marr said, "You've got this character who all the way through the film has this underlying turmoil." Longtime Nolan collaborator, composer Hans Zimmer, penned the soundtrack. Marr has been working since 2007 with Fender to develop and design his own guitar. American Songwriter writes that "Fender had to modify their manufacturing process due to some of Marr's changes, but it will still sell for around the same price as other American-made Fenders."

On 25 February 2013, Marr released his début solo album, The Messenger, in the UK through Warner Bros. and on 26 February in the US through Sire. The album was preceded by the single "Upstarts", released in the UK on 18 February 2013. Marr recorded music for the film The Amazing Spider-Man 2 with Hans Zimmer, Pharrell Williams, Michael Einziger and David A. Stewart.

His second solo album, entitled Playland, was released on 6 October 2014. He also announced a worldwide tour around the release of the "Playland" album that commenced in the UK on 13 October 2014. The album's lead single was "Easy Money". In October 2014, Marr appeared as a guest musician for Hans Zimmer at his two concerts, Hans Zimmer: Revealed, at London's Hammersmith Apollo. In December 2014, Marr announced the cancellation of the remainder of his US tour, in support of Playland, due to a close family illness. In January 2016, Marr announced new and rescheduled dates as part of his West Coast 'California Jam' tour, which took place in the US throughout February and March 2016.

Marr features on "Ballad of the Mighty I", the second single from Noel Gallagher's High Flying Birds' Chasing Yesterday, playing lead guitar, and joined the band for this song at a concert in Manchester. Marr contributed the track "My Monster" for the Blondie album Pollinator, released on 5 May 2017. On 12 March 2018 Marr announced his third solo album, Call the Comet.

Marr performed a set on The Other Stage at the 2019 Glastonbury Festival on 29 June, and later joined The Killers during their headline set on the Pyramid Stage to play guitar on "This Charming Man" and "Mr. Brightside" as part of the band's encore.

As Hans Zimmer composed for the James Bond film No Time to Die, Marr was brought in to perform in the score. He also played guitar in the theme song performed by Billie Eilish, and was present during the track's live debut at the 2020 Brit Awards. In August 2021, Marr signed a new worldwide album deal with BMG and on 31 August he debuted a new single titled "Spirit Power & Soul" on his social media platforms, a song taken from his EP, ''Fever Dreams Pt 1'', that was released on 15 October 2021. His fourth solo album, Fever Dreams Pts 1-4, which is also his first double LP, was released on 25 February 2022. Marr would join the Killers for their 2022 tour to promote the 2020 album Imploding the Mirage, providing an opening act for the American tour dates and also joining the Killers for a Smiths cover and "Mr. Brightside" in the encore. The Los Angeles tour date saw the Killers and Marr also performing on stage with former Fleetwood Mac guitarist Lindsey Buckingham.

Style and influences
Marr's jangly guitar-playing was influenced by Neil Young's work with Crazy Horse, George Harrison (with the Beatles) and James Honeyman-Scott of the Pretenders. During his time in the Smiths, Marr often tuned his guitar up a full step to F to accommodate Morrissey's vocal range, and also used open tunings and is known for creating arpeggio melodies and (sometimes) unusual chord progressions and makes wide use of open strings while chording to create chiming. Citing producer Phil Spector as an influence, Marr said, "I like the idea of records, even those with plenty of space, that sound 'symphonic'. I like the idea of all the players merging into one atmosphere". Marr's other favourite guitarists are James Williamson of the Stooges, Rory Gallagher, Pete Townshend of the Who, Nile Rodgers, Jimi Hendrix and John McGeoch of Magazine and Siouxsie and the Banshees. On songs like "This Charming Man" and "Heaven Knows I'm Miserable Now", Marr's African highlife influences can be heard. 

When forming the Smiths, the Velvet Underground was a key influence, along with Keith Richards of the Rolling Stones. Marc Bolan of T. Rex also had a strong impact on him because of the groove and the sound that put the listener in a daze. Talking about his instrument, he explained : "I try to think about the guitar along the spectrum of James Williamson, who was in the Stooges during the Raw Power era, on the one hand to John McLaughlin and his solo record, My Goal's Beyond. I like all the spectrum in between, and that might be – and is – Richard Lloyd of Television, John McGeoch from Siouxsie and the Banshees, Nile Rodgers. To me these people are magicians and artists."

When performing with the Smiths, he wanted to play a music which was pop. "100% of my focus was on providing interesting guitar hooks and putting some kind of space-age twist on the guitarist's role. The pop guitarist crossed with the mad professor. That's how I thought of myself." In a 2007 interview for the BBC, Marr reported that with the Smiths his goal was to "pare down" his style and avoid rock guitar clichés. Marr forbade himself from using power chords, distortion, lengthy solos, or "big rock chord changes", instead relying on sophisticated arpeggios to create his signature chiming guitar work for the band.

When Marr started to sing as a solo artist in 2012, he explained his decision saying : "[The frontpersons] I related to were Peter Perrett, Colin Newman, Pete Shelley, Siouxsie Sioux. They were singing from the mind and had integrity." He also added : "I'm absolutely not interested in being the frontman in a band that bares my soul or feelings in song. Siouxsie Sioux, or Ray Davies, or Howard Devoto don't sing from some weird, shlocky, sentimental place. What's wrong with singing from the brain?". He also expressed admiration for Bert Jansch, Yeah Yeah Yeahs' Nick Zinner, and Franz Ferdinand's guitarists Alex Kapranos and Nick McCarthy.

Guitars
 
Marr has used a variety of guitars throughout his career, but these are his most notable instruments:
Fender Jaguar – He has played a Jaguar since 2005, and in 2012 Fender issued the Johnny Marr Signature Fender Jaguar, which has several modifications, including specially voiced Johnny Marr custom pickups by Bare Knuckle Pickups and a four position blade switch.
Rickenbacker 330 – This guitar is most often associated with Marr due to its 'jangly' sound for which he is known. He played it with the Smiths and it can also be seen in the promotional video for "Vivid" by Electronic. He also owns a "360" 12-string model that belonged to Pete Townshend. Marr acknowledged that many of the songs that were thought to have been recorded on this Rickenbacker were, in fact, recorded on a Fender Telecaster.
 Fender Stratocaster - Marr used a 1962 Fender Stratocaster to record "There Is a Light That Never Goes Out" and for much of the Smiths' 1986 UK and US tours. He also used a 1963 Fender Stratocaster to record "The Boy with a Thorn in his Side" which was one of his main guitars on the 1986 tour.
 Fender Telecaster - while Marr was associated with the Rickenbacker 330, he admitted that many of the "jangly" songs that were recorded by the Smiths were in fact done with John Porter's 1954 Telecaster, including "This Charming Man".
Gibson Les Paul – Marr owns several, including a rare 1960 model. His cardinal red Les Paul was acquired in 1984 and was used extensively with the Smiths and with The The, appearing in the video for "Dogs of Lust". He has now added a Bigsby tremolo system to this guitar as well as Seymour Duncan pick-ups with coil taps. He gave his 1960 model (also previously owned by Pete Townshend) to Noel Gallagher during Oasis's formative years. Gallagher broke the guitar's neck hitting a fan who jumped on stage. Marr then gave Gallagher yet another vintage (black) Gibson Les Paul (used on much of The Queen is Dead) so Oasis could carry on touring.
Gibson ES-355 – His cherry red model was used heavily with the Smiths during 1984 and inspired Suede guitarist Bernard Butler and Noel Gallagher to buy one for themselves. It was bought for him by Seymour Stein in New York as an incentive for the Smiths to sign to his label, Sire Records. He also owns a black model, which appears in the videos for "Forbidden City" and "For You" by Electronic, and a sunburst, 12-string model that was used heavily on the Smiths' final LP, Strangeways, Here We Come. This 12 string model was later given to Bernard Butler.
Gibson SG – Marr used a cherry red SG as his main guitar when playing with the Healers. He also owns a unique, blonde SG.
Fender Jazzmaster – Marr used several Jazzmasters while he was a member of Modest Mouse.

Amplifiers and effects
Marr has used Fender Amplifiers almost exclusively throughout his career. During his time with the Smiths, he used a Twin Reverb, a Deluxe Reverb and a Bassman amongst others. When playing with the Cribs, he used a Super Reverb. Marr's love of the Fender sound continues to this day with his Deluxe Reverb. He has used other amps, including the Roland JC-120, Vox AC30, Mesa Boogie and Marshall cabinets. Marr typically uses Boss effects units notably that company's CE-2 chorus effect, the TW-1 touch wah wah pedal and the OD-2 overdrive pedal.

Honours, honorary doctorate 
In 2007 Marr was appointed as a Visiting Professor in Music at the University of Salford, where he delivered an inaugural lecture (on 4 November 2008), and a series of workshops and masterclasses to students on the BA (Hons) Popular Music and Recording programme. 

On 19 July 2012, he received an honorary doctorate from the University of Salford for "outstanding achievements" and "changing the face of British guitar music".

On 3 November 2018, Marr unveiled a plaque in his parents' hometown of Athy in County Kildare, Ireland. This was part of the Made of Athy project. 

On 19 January 2021, Marr received the Boss Lifetime Achievement Award as part of NAMM music industry trade show.

In popular culture 
Marr was the titular subject of the 2007 single "Johnny Marr" by the Canadian singer Carole Pope, formerly of the band Rough Trade. Pope described her inspiration and choice of Marr thus: "I was actually getting nostalgic, which I never really do, about living on a certain street in Toronto in the '80s. The Smiths were the soundtrack of that time. I love [...] Morrissey, but I know he's trouble."

Marr is the subject of "Johnny Marr Is Dead" by The Brian Jonestown Massacre; however, he is not mentioned in the lyrics. He is also the subject of Clear's 2003 single satirising the music industry "Johnny Marr Was a Mistake".

Marr is also mentioned in the 1988 single "John Kettley Is a Weatherman" by British band A Tribe of Toffs.

Personal life
Marr and his wife Angie have been together since 1979, before the Smiths formed. They have two children, Sonny and Nile Marr. Nile is also a musician, and was frontman of the band Man Made before going solo. After residing in Portland, Oregon, for more than five years, the family returned to Britain for Marr to record his solo album in Manchester.

Marr gave up eating meat around 1985 in solidarity with Morrissey and Angie. He stated: "It's not a good idea to have a number one album called Meat Is Murder and be seen eating a bacon sarnie." After meeting American rap group Naughty by Nature, he was inspired by their philosophy of strength through health, and soon after quit drinking, smoking and converted to veganism. Marr is a keen runner, and completed the 2010 New York Marathon in a time of 3:54:18. Marr has been a supporter of Manchester City F.C. since 1972, and has been seen attending games. Marr is a patron of the Manchester Modernist Society.

Discography

Studio albums

Live albums

Compilation albums

Albums (as band member)
The Smiths

 The Smiths (1984)
 Meat Is Murder (1985)
 The Queen Is Dead (1986)
 Strangeways, Here We Come (1987)

The The
 Mind Bomb (1989)
 Dusk (1992)

Electronic

 Electronic (1991)
 Raise the Pressure (1996)
 Twisted Tenderness (1999)

Modest Mouse
 We Were Dead Before the Ship Even Sank (2007)
 No One's First and You're Next (2009)

The Cribs
 Ignore the Ignorant (2009)

7 Worlds Collide
 7 Worlds Collide (2001)
 The Sun Came Out (2009)

Albums (as a guest musician)

In the 1980s and 1990s, Marr played on three Billy Bragg recordings. In the late 1980s, he performed on albums by Bryan Ferry and Talking Heads. In the 1990s and 2000s, he performed on three Pet Shop Boys albums, and also plays guitar and harmonica on their Xenomania-produced album, Yes, released in 2009. In the 1990s, he also performed on albums by M People, Beck and Tom Jones. In the 2000s, he played on albums by bands such as Oasis, Pearl Jam, Jane Birkin, Lisa Germano and Crowded House. He also plays guitar on Girls Aloud's fifth album, Out of Control, on a track entitled "Rolling Back the Rivers in Time", as well as harmonica on the track "Love Is the Key". He also appeared on two tracks ("Enough of Me" and "Central") on John Frusciante's album The Empyrean which was released January 2009.

Albums (as producer)

Marion
 The Program (1998)

Haven
 Between the Senses (2002)
 All for a Reason (2004)

Albums (other appearances)
He has also appeared on the following albums:

 Hard Rain Vol One (A Tribute to Bob Dylan) with the song "Don't Think Twice, It's Alright"
 Ruby Trax – The NME's Roaring Forty with the song "The Good, the Bad and the Ugly" (Johnny Marr and Billy Duffy)
 1969 Key to Change with the song "Tendency to Be Free"
 People on the Highway: A Bert Jansch Encomium with the song "A Woman Like You" (Johnny Marr and the Healers)

Extended plays

Singles

As band member Johnny has appeared on singles by the Smiths, the Pretenders, the The, Electronic, 7 Worlds Collide, Modest Mouse, the Cribs and Freak Party and as a guest musician he has appeared on singles by Billy Bragg, Bryan Ferry, Talking Heads, Kirsty MacColl, Pet Shop Boys, Banderas, Electrafixion (as co-writer), Beth Orton, the Charlatans, Quando Quango, Transit Kings, Crowded House, Noel Gallagher's High Flying Birds, the Avalanches, Sandie Shaw, Everything but the Girl, Andrew Berry, A Certain Ratio, Denise Johnson, Stex, England United (as co-writer), the Impossible Dreamers, Billie Eilish, Blondie, Marion, Haven, Black Grape and Blitz Vega.

Marr's recording of "Life Is Sweet", the theme song he wrote for the Channel Four Sitcom The Increasingly Poor Decisions of Todd Margaret, was released on Echo Records and is available digitally.

Marr's cover version of the Depeche Mode track “I Feel You” was in support of Record Store Day. Its B-side was a version of "Please, Please, Please Let Me Get What I Want" (live). Both tracks are also available digitally.

The non-album single "Armatopia" was selected for the soundtrack for eFootball Pro Evolution Soccer 2020.

References

Sources

External links

 
 Official The Smiths Website

1963 births
Living people
Academics of the University of Salford
Alternative rock guitarists
British indie pop musicians
British alternative rock musicians
British harmonica players
British indie rock musicians
Electronic (band) members
English autobiographers
English expatriates in the United States
English male guitarists
English male singers
English people of Irish descent
English record producers
English republicans
English rock guitarists
English songwriters
Modest Mouse members
Musicians from Manchester
NME Awards winners
People from Ardwick
The Cribs members
The Pretenders members
The Smiths members
The The members
Warner Records artists